is a railway station located in Higashiyama-ku, Kyoto, Kyoto Prefecture, Japan.

Line
Keihan Electric Railway Keihan Main Line

Layout
The station has one island platform underground, and is located under the junction on Kawabata-dori and Gojo-dori.

Surroundings

Kiyomizu-dera
Gojo Bridge (Kamo River)
Gojo-dori (Japan National Route 1)
Kawabata-dori
Higashiyama Ward Building

Adjacent stations

References

External links
 Station information by Keihan Railway

Railway stations in Japan opened in 1910
Railway stations in Kyoto